In algebra, a Weyl module is a representation of a reductive algebraic group, introduced by  and named after Hermann Weyl. In characteristic 0 these representations are irreducible, but in positive characteristic they can be reducible, and their decomposition into irreducible components can be hard to determine.

See also 
Borel–Weil–Bott theorem
Garnir relations

Further reading

Representation theory
Algebraic groups